Sally (originally titled The Sally Jessy Raphael Show) is an American syndicated tabloid talk show that was hosted by radio talk show host Sally Jessy Raphael. It originally was a half-hour local St. Louis television program, debuting October 17, 1983, on KSDK (channel 5), and ran in syndication until May 24, 2002, with repeats running until September 6.

Overview
Sally Jessy Raphael was one of the first audience-participation, issue-driven talk shows to have a female host, predating The Oprah Winfrey Show by three years. The program was an iconic part of the tabloid talk show genre that pervaded daytime television throughout much of the 1980s and 1990s.

When the show started it covered topics such as people with extreme religious beliefs, but in the later shows Sally and her after specialist Pat Ferrari moved on to more personal family matters such as pregnant and/or out-of-control teens. Topics of the show varied widely, from the controversial and hard-hitting stories to more lighthearted fare such as hypnotists getting guests to do funny gags.

As a result, when content ratings were introduced in the 1990s, the ratings for Sally varied widely from episode to episode, from TV-G to TV-14. Drag queens were frequently featured on the show, usually in fun, and some even dressed as Sally impersonators. The show that garnered her largest ratings was dedicated to women with large breasts.

In the early years of the nationally syndicated run, Sally Jessy Raphael remained a half-hour show, but in 1986, Raphael expanded production of each episode to an hour's length. However, broadcast markets were allowed to retain a half-hour packaging of her show, which most opted for, especially since stations already had successful half-hour entries, no matter local or national, scheduled before or after Sally. The 30-minute edits resorted to running the closing credit crawls before segments wrapped up, often as guests still had the floor. While only a select few markets picked up the full-hour Sally shows in the 1986-87 season, an increasing number of stations made the option over the next few years, especially as networks started to free up their daytime slots. For example, in January 1989, WCVB-TV in Boston, which had been airing the 30-minute Sally broadcasts at 11 a.m. (having previously aired them in late-night slots from 1984 to 1987), opted to go with the hour-long version when the ABC soap opera Ryan's Hope, which WCVB aired (out of network pattern) at 11:30, was canceled. By 1990, all stations that carried Sally were airing her shows for 60 minutes.

From the summer of 1987 through August 1989, the show originated from the studios of New Haven, Connecticut's WTNH (channel 8), where one large studio of the ABC affiliate's facility was divided to house both the talk show and WTNH's news set. In August 1989, Sally moved into the Unitel facilities in Manhattan, also home to MTV and, later, Rush Limbaugh, whom Raphael did not like. At one point in the feud between Limbaugh and Raphael, staffers for Sally leaked a photo of Raphael without her makeup or glasses to Limbaugh, and a staffer (without Limbaugh's permission) put the photo on air during Limbaugh's show. In 1998, the show moved to new production facilities in the former grand ballroom of the Hotel Pennsylvania (which had been modified as such by NEP Broadcasting), also in New York City, where it remained until its cancellation in 2002, sharing the space with sister talk show Maury with differing sets and studio layouts.

Famous con man Steve Comisar appeared on Sally as a fraud prevention expert, under the name Brett Champion.

The show was canceled due to low ratings, as well as the fading popularity of the genre as a whole, in 2002.

Sally has never been rerun on traditional television. In 2017, Nosey, a free online streaming service offering video of daytime television shows began making episodes of Sally available for viewing.

In popular culture
The PBS children's show, Sesame Street parodied this talk show and its host as Sally Messy Yuckyael, a Grouch-type character.

Sally appeared in a Paramount 1991 film The Addams Family as a cameo.

Broadcast UK history
Lifestyle (1990–1993)
Sky One (1993–1995)

References

External links
 

1983 American television series debuts
2002 American television series endings
1980s American television talk shows
1990s American television talk shows
2000s American television talk shows
2010s American television talk shows
2020s American television talk shows
Daytime Emmy Award for Outstanding Talk Show winners
English-language television shows
First-run syndicated television programs in the United States
Television series by Universal Television